Fatḥ al-Bārī fī Sharḥ Ṣaḥīḥ al-Bukhārī is a multi-volume commentary on the Sunni hadith collection Sahih al-Bukhari, composed by Ibn Hajar al-'Asqalani Shafi. Considered his magnum opus, it is the most celebrated hadith commentary. It is reported that it took Ibn Hajar 25 years to finish his work.

Reception
Abd al-Hayy ibn Abd al-Kabir al-Kattani  said: 
“When the author of al-Hittah  quoted Ibn Khaldun as saying that the explanation of Sahih al-Bukhari is a debt upon the Muslim nation, he said, ‘This debt has been fulfilled by the explanation of al-Hafith Ibn Hajar.’ For that reason, when it was suggested to Muhammad ibn ‘Ali al-Shawkani, that he write an explanation of al-Jami’ al-Sahih by al-Bukhari just as others have, he responded, ‘There is no migration after al-Fath,’ referring to Fath al-Bari".

Abd al-Hakim Murad said of Fath al-Bari in the introduction to the translation of Ibn Hajar al-Asqalani's commentary on selected hadith (published as a booklet by the Muslim Academic Trust): "The importance of this literature may be gauged by the fact that at least seventy full commentaries have been written on Imam al-Bukhari’s great Sahih... the most celebrated [of which] is without question the magnificent Fath al-Bari (Victory of the Creator) by Imam Ibn Hajar al-‘Asqalani, a work which was the crown both of its genre and of the Imam’s academic career. It is appreciated by the ulema for the doctrinal soundness of its author, for its complete coverage of Bukhari’s material, its mastery of the relevant Arabic sciences, the wisdom it shows in drawing lessons (fawa’id) from the hadiths it expounds, and its skill in resolving complex disputes over variant readings."

Islamicist Norman Calder described Ibn Hajar's work as "the most magnificent achievement of exegetical discourse".

Editions
Editions include one from the Egyptian Press of Mustafa Al-Babi Al-Halabi, 1959 (1378 A.H.).

External links

 Online edition (Arabic).

References

15th-century books
Sunni literature
Hadith commentaries
Hadith collections
Mamluk literature